Stanley J Wilson was a male athlete who competed for England.

Athletics career
He competed for England in the javelin at the 1934 British Empire Games in London.

Wilson was an early pioneer of the javelin in Britain, represented Birchfield Harriers  and was the 1937 AAA champion.

Personal life
He was a student and then a lecturer at Carnegie College of Physical Education, in Leeds and became a notable coach.

References

English male javelin throwers
Athletes (track and field) at the 1934 British Empire Games
Commonwealth Games competitors for England